Huang Xianyuan (born February 2, 1966) is a retired Chinese rhythmic gymnast.

She competed for China in the rhythmic gymnastics all-around competition at the 1984 Summer Olympics in Los Angeles. She was 32nd in the qualification round and didn't advance to the final.

References 

1966 births
Living people
Chinese rhythmic gymnasts
Gymnasts at the 1984 Summer Olympics
Olympic gymnasts of China
20th-century Chinese women